Arce or Arze is a Spanish and also Basque surname. Notable people with the surname include:

 Aniceto Arce (1824–1906), 22nd President of Bolivia 
 Ayana Holloway Arce, American physicist
 Eduardo Arze Quiroga (1907–1989), Bolivian diplomat
 Eleutherius of Rocca d'Arce, saint
 Fernando Arce (born 1980), Mexican footballer
 Francisco Arce (1821–1878), Mexican soldier in Alta California (see Rancho Santa Ysabel (Arce))
 Francisco Arce (born 1971), Paraguayan footballer
 Gaspar Núñez de Arce (1834–1903), Spanish writer and statesman
 Gregorio Vasquez de Arce y Ceballos (1639–1711), Colombian painter
 José Antonio Arze (1904–1955), Bolivian sociologist
 Juan Carlos Arce (born 1985), Bolivian footballer
 Líber Arce (1938–1968), martyred Uruguayan student activist
 Luis Arce (born 1963), 67th President of Bolivia
 Manuel José Arce (1787–1847), Salvadoran politician
 Vicente Arze (born 1985), Bolivian footballer

See also
 Arce (disambiguation)

References

Spanish-language surnames
Basque-language surnames